Eatoniella varicifera is a species of minute sea snail, a marine gastropod mollusk in the family Eatoniellidae, the eatoniellids.

Distribution

Description 
The maximum recorded shell length is 2.15 mm.

Habitat 
Minimum recorded depth is 4 m. Maximum recorded depth is 10 m.

References

External links

Eatoniellidae
Gastropods described in 1983
Taxa named by Winston Ponder